Austria competed at the 2006 Winter Olympics in Turin, Italy.

Medalists

Alpine skiing 

Men's

Women's

Note: In the men's combined, run 1 is the downhill, and runs 2 and 3 are the slalom. In the women's combined, run 1 and 2 are the slalom, and run 3 the downhill.

Biathlon 

Both Wolfgang Perner and Wolfgang Rottmann had their results annulled and declared permanently ineligible after violations of the IOC Anti-doping Rules.

Bobsleigh

Cross-country skiing 

Four cross-country skiers, Roland Diethart, Johannes Eder, Jürgen Pinter and Martin Tauber were permanently barred by the IOC  for violations of the Anti-Doping Code, and their results were annulled.

Distance

Sprint

Figure skating 

Key: CD = Compulsory Dance, FD = Free Dance, FS = Free Skate, OD = Original Dance, SP = Short Program

Freestyle skiing

Luge

Nordic combined 

Note: 'Deficit' refers to the amount of time behind the leader a competitor began the cross-country portion of the event. Italicized numbers show the final deficit from the winner's finishing time.

Skeleton

Ski jumping 

Note: PQ indicates a skier was pre-qualified for the final, based on entry rankings.

Snowboarding 

Parallel GS

Men

Women

Key: '+ Time' represents a deficit; the brackets indicate the results of each run.

Snowboard cross

Speed skating

References 

Nations at the 2006 Winter Olympics
2006
Winter Olympics